Nino Staffieri (6 September 1931 – 31 July 2018) was an Italian bishop of the Roman Catholic Diocese of La Spezia-Sarzana-Brugnato.

He was ordained a priest on 9 June 1955.

He was appointed bishop of Carpi on 11 July 1989, receiving his episcopal consecration on 9 September 1989 from Cardinal Ugo Poletti.

He was appointed bishop of La Spezia-Sarzana-Brugnato on 10 July 1999.

Staffieri retired as bishop on 6 December 2007, and at the time of his death was vice-president of Episcopal Conference of Liguria.

References

External links
Profile of Mons. Staffieri www.catholic-hierarchy.org
Official page of diocese of La Spezia-Sarzana-Brugnato

1931 births
2018 deaths
People from Casalpusterlengo
Bishops in Emilia-Romagna
Bishops in Liguria
20th-century Italian Roman Catholic bishops